Konrad Zuse Program is one-year fellowship for ICT entrepreneurs, supported from the Federal Foreign Office of Germany and the German Investment and Development Corporation (DEG). Konrad Zuse Program gives the opportunity to receive training in German companies operating in the area of Information & Communication Technology (ICT) in order to narrow the digital divide in a globalize world. 
Konrad-Zuse-Program included an academic component as well as internships in German companies active in the same sector as the prospective start-up.

Winners

This award was given to nine people from around the world:
 Yasser Elshantaf
 Karla Magpayo
 Thomas Tan
 Mohammad Abid Azam	
 Adama Ndembele
 Rafael Mejia
 Jean Claude Bwenge
 Patricia Ulloa
 Silas Sheehama

See also

 List of computer-related awards

References

2009 establishments in Germany
Education in Germany
Academic transfer
Computer-related awards